Nala Musalmana  is a village and a union council of Kallar Syedan Tehsil in Rawalpindi District Punjab, Pakistan.

References

Union councils of Kallar Syedan Tehsil
Populated places in Kallar Syedan Tehsil
Villages in Kallar Syedan Tehsil